The 2017 Kansas City, Kansas mayoral election took place on November 7, 2017, to elect the Mayor/CEO of the United Government of Wyandotte County and Kansas City, Kansas. The election is officially nonpartisan. Incumbent Mark Holland ran for reelection and faced David Alvey in the general election. Alvey and Holland received 51.84% and 47.4% of the vote respect.
Holland conceded on election night.

Primary Election

Candidates
The following people filed for candidacy in the primary.

Mark Holland, incumbent mayor
Filed for re-election on February 6, 2017.
David Alvey, director on the Board of Public Utilities
David Haley, Kansas state senator 
Janice Grant Witt, financial services broker 
D. Keith Jordan, Kansas City radio personality

Election Results
Holland and Alvey received enough votes in the primary to go on to the general election in November.

General Election

Candidates
Mark Holland, incumbent mayor
David Alvey

Election Results
The general election took place on November 7, 2017. Holland conceded the election to Alvey the same day.

References

Kansas City
Kansas City
Mayoral elections in Kansas City, Kansas